Sodium trimethylsilylpropanesulfonate (DSS) is the organosilicon compound with the formula (CH3)3SiCH2CH2CH2SO3−Na+.  It is the sodium salt of trimethylsilylpropanesulfonic acid.  A white, water-soluble solid, it is used as a chemical shift standard for proton NMR spectroscopy of aqueous solutions.  The chemical shift, specifically the signal for the trimethylsilyl group, is relatively insensitive to pH.

The proton spectrum of DSS also exhibits resonances at 2.91 ppm (m), 1.75 ppm (m), and 0.63 ppm (m) at an intensity of 22% of the reference resonance at 0 ppm.

Alternatives
Sodium trimethylsilyl propionate (TSP) is a related compound used as an NMR standard. It uses a carboxylic acid instead of the sulfonic acid found in DSS to confer water solubility. As a weak acid, TSP is more sensitive to changes in pH.

4,4-Dimethyl-4-silapentane-1-ammonium trifluoroacetate (DSA) has also been proposed as an alternative, to overcome certain drawbacks of DSS.

References

Sulfonic acids
Trimethylsilyl compounds
Organic sodium salts
Nuclear magnetic resonance